Ficus drupacea var. pubescens, also known as the Mysore fig (named for Mysore, India) or brown woolly fig, is a variety of F. drupacea distinguished by its fruits and leaves having a dense yellow-brown pubescence. It is naturally distributed throughout Southeast Asia, and has been introduced elsewhere. It forms a distinct shape with large, buttressing roots. Its leaves are characterized by a distinctly pointed tip, and it is pollinated by small wasps.

It has been introduced and popularly recognized for its size and form in various locations, including in Florida, its root systems reaching  or more in diameter. However, the shallow base of the roots (~) has led to susceptibility during hurricanes.

References 

drupacea var. pubescens